Ankai Killa railway station is a station located on the Daund Manmad branch line in Manmad, Nashik District, India. The Pune Manmad and the Pune Nizambad passenger trains stop at this station.

Railway stations in Nashik district